The Slovenian Republic Football Cup was the football cup in SR Slovenia within the Yugoslav football system. The winner has qualified for the Yugoslav Cup. After the independence of Slovenia in 1991 it transformed to the Slovenian Football Cup.

Finals

Key

Performance by club

Yugoslav Cup

Slovenian clubs in Yugoslav Cup

References
General

Football cup competitions in Slovenia
Defunct football competitions in Yugoslavia